The AFL final eight system is an eight-team championship playoff tournament developed and adopted by the Australian Football League in the 2000 season. The eight teams, which are ranked or seeded in advance of the tournament, participate in a four-week tournament, with two teams eliminated in each of the first three weeks. The grand final is played in the fourth week between the two remaining teams, with the winning team awarded the premiership.

The system is designed to give the top four teams an easier road to the grand final than the second four teams. The top four teams need to win only two finals to reach the grand final, while the second four teams need to win three. The two winning teams of the top four receive a bye in the second week of the playoff and then play at home in the third week, and the two losing teams play at home in the second week.

The AFL introduced the system in 2000 to address several perceived issues with the McIntyre final eight system that had been in use in that competition from 1994–1999. The system has also been adopted by the Victorian Football League and National Rugby League. Similar systems are used by Super League, and were previously used by the Australian Rugby League in the 1995 and 1996 seasons.

Summary

Finals format

Week one
 1st qualifying final: 1st ranked team hosts 4th ranked team.
 2nd qualifying final: 2nd ranked team hosts 3rd ranked team.
 1st elimination final: 5th ranked team hosts 8th ranked team.
 2nd elimination final: 6th ranked team hosts 7th ranked team.

The eight finalists are split into two groups for the opening week of the Finals Series.  The top four teams have the best chance of winning the premiership and play the two Qualifying Finals.  The winners get a bye through to Week Three of the tournament to play home Preliminary Finals, while the losers play home Semi-Finals in Week Two.  The bottom four teams play the two Elimination Finals, where the winners advance to Week Two away games and the losers' seasons are over.

Week two
 1st semi-final: Loser of 1st QF hosts winner of 1st EF
 2nd semi-final: Loser of 2nd QF hosts winner of 2nd EF

Week three
 1st Preliminary Final: Winner of 1st QF hosts winner of 2nd SF
 2nd Preliminary Final: Winner of 2nd QF hosts winner of 1st SF

Week four
 Grand Final: Winner of 1st PF meets Winner of 2nd PF.

Advantages for ladder positions
Under this finals system, the final eight teams are broken up into two halves of four teams which are in turn split into two pairs each. The higher a team's position on the ladder, the greater benefits they receive. The top half of the ladder has two key advantages. These teams only need to win twice to reach the grand final (either a Qualifying or Semi-Final and a Preliminary Final), and they have the benefit of the double-chance; since the qualifying final is non-elimination, losers still have a second chance to reach the grand final by winning their two other Finals. Teams in the top six get the benefit of at least one home final; the top two teams play two home finals.

A team's final rank in the home-and-away season also determines their pairings for the first week. In the qualifying finals, 1st place plays 4th place and 2nd place plays 3rd place; in the Elimination Finals, 5th place plays 8th place and 6th place plays 7th place. The better a team's rank, the more advantageous (or less disadvantageous) the matchup. After the first week, matchups are determined directly by the results of the previous week.

First and second
The top two seeds host their first two finals: the qualifying final and whatever final they play next (Preliminary Final if they win, Semi-Final if they lose). They also have the benefit of only needing to win twice to reach the grand final. If they win the qualifying final, they earn the bye to the Preliminary Final; otherwise they get the double-chance and can still reach the Preliminary Final by winning the Semifinal.

Third and fourth
The next two seeds visit for the qualifying final but then host their next final. Like the top two, these teams only need to win twice to reach the grand final. Winning the qualifying final earns them the bye to the Preliminary Final; losing gives them the double-chance via the Semi-Final.

Fifth and sixth
Fifth and sixth place host their Elimination Final and visit any other finals they reach. These teams must win all three of their finals (Elimination, Semi-, and Preliminary Finals) to avoid elimination.

Seventh and eighth
The last two teams visit throughout the finals and also must win all three of their finals to avoid elimination.

See also
 Argus finals system
 McIntyre system
 Top five play-offs
 Top six play-offs
 Super League play-offs

References

External links
Grand Finals at the MCG Contains a brief summary of the finals systems used in the VFL/AFL

Australian Football League
Tournament systems